Leroy Snyder (February 13, 1931 – October 1, 2001), also known as Duke, was an American serial killer who was convicted and sentenced to life in prison for killing seven people in Camden, New Jersey over seven months in 1969. He was imprisoned at New Jersey State Prison until his death in 2001.

Early life 
Snyder was born on February 13, 1931, in Camden, New Jersey, the fifth in a family of seven children. In the late 1930s, the family broke apart, and as such they lived in a socially disadvantageous environment, as Leroy and his siblings were sent to live in multiple locations. In the mid-1940s, Leroy, along with other siblings returned to Camden, where Leroy sparked his early criminal escapades.

Crimes 
In December 1949, at age 18 he attempted to strangle a local woman using a clothesline. Snyder was arrested not long after, and was convicted of the crime, but was released after a short time in prison. He returned to Camden once again, but was apprehended by authorities again after making vulgar threats against two young women. He was convicted but released again after a short prison term. After his release, Snyder began to find work, engaging in low skilled labor.

Snyder was once again arrested in July 1955 for robbing and assaulting a cab driver in Philadelphia, Pennsylvania, for which he was given a five-year sentence. Another reported arrest came in 1959 for Armed robbery, for which he was sentenced to ten years imprisonment, which he served fully, and he was released in early 1969.

Murders 
On September 11, 1969, Snyder was arrested once again, and charged with the murder of 58-year old Gertrude Friedman, whose throat was slashed the day before in her apartment in Camden, New Jersey. He was arrested after police noticed he was wearing Friedman's wristwatch. While in jail awaiting trial for the murder, in July 1970 he was connected to a string of violent murders that occurred throughout the previous year, and he was indicted on six charges of murder.

 Lula Crawley, 45, was killed on February 14, 1969. She was stabbed to death in her South Camden used furniture store. She was found laying face down in a pool of blood, gagged, with her hands bound behind her back with heavy twine. She was stabbed 13 times in the chest, neck and back.
 Mary Freeman, 56, was killed on April 12, 1969. She was found floating face down in a foot-and-a-half of water in a vacant house. She was stabbed to death.  When asked by the judge why he killed Freeman, Synder replied, "She was a prostitute. I caught her with her hand in my pocket." An autopsy report indicated that Freeman had been raped.
 Shirley Brittingham, 32, was killed on April 25, 1969. She was six months pregnant when she was found brutally beaten, shot 7 times, and stabbed to death. 
 Lovie Williams, 52, was killed on May 19, 1969. She was found with her face badly beaten and her stomach slit open. Snyder admitted to killing Williams, saying he had gone to her home, "with the intent to rob her."
 Warren Wells, 27, was killed in June 1969. He was Snyder’s former roommate. He was found beaten, his throat slashed, and shot in the back 6 times. Snyder told the judge, "I killed him for his paycheck."
 Vera Stevens, 45, was killed on August 9, 1969. She was found beaten to death. Snyder said, "I beat her on the head with a rock." An autopsy report indicated that Stevens had been raped.

Sentence and death 
Authorities also investigated Snyder's possible involvement in three additional murders committed in the Camden area, but he was eventually ruled out as a suspect. The victims were six women and one man, all of them friends or acquaintances of Snyder. At least two of the women had been raped, and on another occasion the victim was killed for financial gain. Snyder admitted to all the murders. Under New Jersey law, he couldn't be sentenced to death after a confession, so on July 17, Snyder was sentenced to three terms of life imprisonment.

On October 1, 2001, Snyder, who had served 31 years of his initial sentence died in New Jersey State Prison, at age 70. His sentence required him to serve 43½ years in prison before being considered for parole, which would have been in 2014, when he would have been 81 years old.

See also 
 List of serial killers in the United States

References 

1931 births
2001 deaths
20th-century American criminals
American male criminals
Male serial killers
American people convicted of murder
American prisoners sentenced to life imprisonment
People convicted of murder by New Jersey
Prisoners sentenced to life imprisonment by New Jersey
People from Camden, New Jersey
1969 murders in the United States
Violence against women in the United States
20th-century African-American people
Criminals from New Jersey
Serial killers who died in prison custody
Prisoners who died in New Jersey detention
American people convicted of robbery
American people convicted of burglary
American rapists